Gallitzin State Forest is a Pennsylvania State Forest in Pennsylvania Bureau of Forestry District #6.  The main offices are located in Ebensburg in Cambria County, Pennsylvania in the United States.

District #6 also includes Blair County.

Gallitzin State Forest was named to honor Demetrius Augustine Gallitzin. Gallitzin was a Roman Catholic priest and is called The Apostle of the Alleghenies for his pioneering mission work in the area in the early 19th century.

History
Gallitzin State Forest was formed as a direct result of the depletion of the forests of Pennsylvania that took place during the mid-to-late 19th century. Conservationists like Dr. Joseph Rothrock became concerned that the forests would not regrow if they were not managed properly. Lumber and Iron companies had harvested the old-growth forests for various reasons. The clear cut the forests and left behind nothing but dried tree tops and rotting stumps. The sparks of passing steam locomotives ignited wildfires that prevented the formation of second growth forests. The conservationists feared that the forest would never regrow if there was not a change in the philosophy of forest management. They called for the state to purchase land from the lumber and iron companies and the lumber and iron companies were more than willing to sell their land since that had depleted the natural resources of the forests. The changes began to take place in 1895 when Dr. Rothrock was appointed the first commissioner of the Pennsylvania Department of Forests and Waters, the forerunner of today's Pennsylvania Department of Conservation and Natural Resources. The Pennsylvania General Assembly passed a piece of legislation in 1897 that authorized the purchase of "unseated lands for forest reservations." This was the beginning of the State Forest system.

Environment
Gallitzin State Forest protects part of the Appalachian mixed mesophytic forests ecoregion.  The forest is located at the western edge of the Allegheny Plateau, at elevations of about 2400 feet (730 m) above sea level.  This is in the lower reaches of an alpine-type climate, and species such as birch trees, more common further north in New England and Canada, may be found in the forest.

Nearby state parks
Blue Knob State Park
Laurel Ridge State Park

References

 Note: As of July 2006, this web page has not been updated to reflect the Pennsylvania State Forest Districts realignment.
 Note: Map showing districts after the July 1, 2005 realignment

Pennsylvania state forests
Protected areas of Bedford County, Pennsylvania
Protected areas of Cambria County, Pennsylvania
Protected areas of Indiana County, Pennsylvania
Protected areas of Somerset County, Pennsylvania